Douglas F. Stitt is a United States Army lieutenant general who serves as the deputy chief of staff for personnel of the United States Army. He previously served as the director of military personnel management.

In February 2022, he was nominated for promotion to lieutenant general and assignment as deputy chief of staff for personnel of the United States Army.

References

Living people
Place of birth missing (living people)
Recipients of the Distinguished Service Medal (US Army)
Recipients of the Legion of Merit
United States Army generals
United States Army personnel of the Iraq War
United States Army personnel of the War in Afghanistan (2001–2021)
Year of birth missing (living people)